The Royal Life Saving Society Canada, commonly known as the Lifesaving Society or LSS, is a Canadian registered charity that works to prevent water-related injuries through various programs across Canada. The Lifesaving Society is an independent organization that is composed of ten provincial/territorial branches, tens of thousands of individual members, and over 4,000 affiliated swimming pools, waterfronts, schools and clubs. The Society helps prevent drowning and aquatic injury through its training programs, public education, drowning-prevention research, safety management and overseeing the sport of lifesaving.

History
The Royal Life Saving Society arrived in Canada in 1894 with its Honorary Representative, Arthur Lewis Cochrane, who joined the faculty of Upper Canada College in Toronto as a "Drill Instructor". The Society became formalized with the establishment in 1908 of the Ontario Branch as the first Canadian branch of the Royal Life Saving Society UK.

Programs and certifications
Annually, over one million Canadians take part in the Society's swimming, lifesaving, lifeguard and leadership training programs. The Lifesaving Society is incorporated in Canada under the name "The Royal Life Saving Society Canada/La Société Royale de Sauvetage Canada", and it has branches for every province and territory. The Lifesaving Society represents Canada in the International Life Saving Federation and the Royal Life Saving Society Commonwealth.

The Society sets the standards for aquatic safety in Canada and certifies Canada's National Lifeguards. The Society is the Canadian governing body for the sport of lifesaving, which is recognized by the International Olympic Committee and the Commonwealth Games Federation.

Lifesaving Society certifications include:
Canadian Lifesaving Program
 Canadian Swim Patrol Program: Pre-Bronze Awards
 Rookie Patrol
 Ranger Patrol
 Star Patrol
 Bronze Medal Awards
 Bronze Star
 Bronze Medallion
 Bronze Cross
 National Lifeguard in four options: Pool, Waterpark, Waterfront, and Surf
 Other Awards
 Lifesaving Fitness
 Boat Rescue
 Distinction
 Leadership Training Program
 Instructor Training
 Swim Instructor
 Lifesaving Instructor
 Advanced Instructor
 National Lifeguard Instructor
 First Aid Instructor
 Examiner Training: Examination Standards Clinic
 Other Programs
 Boat Operator Accredited Training (BOAT)
 BOAT Instructor

The Lifesaving Society also trains coaches and officials for lifesaving sport.

In 2012, the Lifesaving Society joined forces with the Canadian Red Cross and the Public Health Agency of Canada to launch the Open Water Wisdom initiative, which is  a community water activity safety program dedicated to bringing awareness to recreational water safety issues nationally and in hundreds of remote communities across Canada.

See also
Royal Life Saving Society Australia
Surf lifesaving

References

External links
Lifesaving Society
Lifesaving Society Ontario
International Life Saving Federation
Open Water Wisdom

Charities based in Canada
Surf lifesaving
Lifesaving organizations